The Family Arena is a multi-purpose arena in St. Charles, Missouri, built in 1999. The arena seats 9,643 for hockey, 9,755 for football, 10,467 for basketball, 6,339 for half-house concerts and up to 11,522 for end-stage concerts.

 
Currently it is home to the St. Louis Ambush of the Major Arena Soccer League.

The Family Arena hosted Boeing Integrated Defense Systems' "Recommitment to Ethics Day" in 2005 and 2006 for Greater St. Louis.

Until Chaifetz Arena opened in 2008, Family Arena was the St. Louis stop for the Ringling Brothers and Barnum and Bailey Circus, Disney on Ice and Champions on Ice. The latter moved to Chaifetz that year while the circus and Disney on Ice moved to Enterprise Center to replace the St. Louis Billikens, who had also moved to Chaifetz.

Missouri Valley Conference women's basketball tournament 

From 2008 to 2015, the Family Arena was host to the Missouri Valley Conference Women's Basketball Tournament.

Religious events and concerts 

The Family Arena has served as an annual location for one of many world wide regional Bible conventions hosted by Jehovah's Witnesses. The Christian rock band MercyMe performed at Family Arena annually from 2007 until 2013.

Professional wrestling 

The Family Arena has also been host to nationally televised professional wrestling events. The arena was the site of the ECW's Wrestlepalooza 2000 event on April 16, 2000. The arena also hosted Total Nonstop Action Wrestling's Lockdown pay-per-view on April 15, 2007 and the 2010 edition on April 18, 2010. The arena also hosted Ring of Honor’s Gateway to Honor on February 29, 2020.

High school and college commencement ceremonies 

The arena has hosted commencement ceremonies for Lindenwood University, Missouri Baptist University and Maryville University as well as for several area high schools.

2017 NCAA Women's Frozen Four 

The 2017 NCAA National Collegiate Women's Ice Hockey Tournament, known as the "Frozen Four," was held at the Family Arena in 2017. The quarterfinals were contested at the campuses of the seeded teams on March 11, 2017. The Frozen Four was played on March 17 and 19, 2017 at Family Arena, with Lindenwood University serving as the host. An agreement with the Big Ten Network resulted in the championship game being televised live for the first time since 2010.

Professional sports 

Family Arena served as the former home of the St. Louis Swarm basketball team, the Missouri River Otters and St. Charles Chill ice hockey teams, the RiverCity Rage and River City Raiders indoor football teams, and the St. Louis Steamers indoor soccer team.

References

External links
Family Arena

St. Charles, Missouri
Indoor ice hockey venues in the United States
Basketball venues in Missouri
Convention centers in Missouri
Indoor soccer venues in Missouri
Sports in St. Charles, Missouri
Buildings and structures in St. Charles County, Missouri
Music venues in Missouri
Tourist attractions in St. Charles County, Missouri
1999 establishments in Missouri
Sports venues completed in 1999
Indoor arenas in Missouri
Sports venues in St. Louis
Sports venues in Missouri